Royston is a city in Franklin, Hart, and Madison counties in the U.S. state of Georgia. The population was 2,649 at the 2020 census.

History
A post office called Royston has been in operation since 1878. The community was named after W.A. Royston, a local merchant.

The Georgia General Assembly first incorporated Royston in 1879.

Geography
Royston is located in the southeast corner of Franklin County and the southwest corner of Hart County at  (34.285592, -83.109841). A small portion extends south into Madison County. U.S. Route 29 passes through the center of town, leading northeast  to Hartwell and southwest  to Athens. Georgia State Route 17 leads north from Royston  to Lavonia and southeast  to Elberton.

Demographics

As of the census of 2000, there were 2,493 people, 1,016 households, and 610 families residing in the city. The racial makeup of the city was 74.25% White, 23.23% African American, 0.08% Native American, 0.68% Asian, 0.36% from other races, and 1.40% from two or more races. Hispanic or Latino of any race were 1.24% of the population.

There were 1,016 households, out of which 27.2% had children under the age of 18 living with them, 37.3% were married couples living together, 19.7% had a female householder with no husband present, and 39.9% were non-families. 35.9% of all households were made up of individuals, and 20.1% had someone living alone who was 65 years of age or older. The average household size was 2.27 and the average family size was 2.97.

In the city, the population was spread out, with 23.4% under the age of 18, 8.5% from 18 to 24, 22.7% from 25 to 44, 20.1% from 45 to 64, and 25.4% who were 65 years of age or older. The median age was 40 years. For every 100 females, there were 78.6 males. For every 100 females age 18 and over, there were 68.6 males.

The median income for a household in the city was $22,024, and the median income for a family was $31,845. Males had a median income of $27,500 versus $21,580 for females. The per capita income for the city was $14,750. About 19.7% of families and 24.7% of the population were below the poverty threshold, including 25.7% of those under age 18 and 23.1% of those age 65 or over.

Culture
 Ty Cobb Museum
Royston Public Library which is a branch of the Athens Regional Library System

Notable people
Orville Vernon Burton, scholar
Spud Chandler, professional baseball pitcher and American League Most Valuable Player in 1943 
Ty Cobb, member of the Baseball Hall of Fame
Dee Dowis, Air Force Academy quarterback
Clete Donald Johnson, Jr., member of the U.S. House of Representatives and United States Trade Representative
Tony Jones, professional football player
Terry Kay, author
Gary Walker, professional football player
FPSRussia, YouTuber

References

External links

City of Royston official website

Cities in Georgia (U.S. state)
Cities in Franklin County, Georgia
Cities in Hart County, Georgia
Cities in Madison County, Georgia
1879 establishments in Georgia (U.S. state)